Frank Paul Zeidler (September 20, 1912 – July 7, 2006) was an American socialist politician and mayor of Milwaukee, Wisconsin, serving three terms from April 20, 1948, to April 18, 1960. Zeidler, a member of the Socialist Party of America, is the last Socialist Party candidate to be elected mayor of a large American city.

Early life and career 
Zeidler was born in Milwaukee on September 20, 1912. He studied at both the University of Chicago and Marquette University, but was never able to graduate due to ill health. He became a socialist because of socialism's emphasis on peace and improving the conditions for workers. In an interview, Zeidler said he chose the ideology of socialism in 1933 "because of several things in its philosophy. One was the brotherhood of people all over the world. Another was its struggle for peace. Another was the equal distribution of economic goods. Another was the idea of cooperation. A fifth was the idea of democratic planning in order to achieve your goals. Those were pretty good ideas". He distanced himself from the beliefs of communism, especially communism linked in any way to the Soviet Union. Indeed, he was (and remained) an active Lutheran, a religious commitment which he saw as being fulfilled rather than contradicted by his Socialist activism. Later however, he credited his adoption of socialism to reading left-wing literature, with the majority being written by Eugene V. Debs and Norman Thomas during the Great Depression.

Zeidler became an active member of the Young People's Socialist League (YPSL), the youth branch of the Socialist Party of America, he later became the leader of the Milwaukee branch of the Red Falcons during the 1930s.

Elections 
Zeidler was elected Milwaukee County Surveyor in 1938 on the Progressive Party ballot line (the Socialist Party and Progressives were in coalition in Milwaukee at that time). He was elected to a six-year term on the Milwaukee Board of School Directors (a non-partisan office) in 1941, just after his brother Carl Zeidler was elected Mayor of Milwaukee in 1940. In 1942, Frank Zeidler was the Socialist nominee for Governor of Wisconsin, receiving 1.41% of the vote in a six-way race. He was re-elected to the Milwaukee School Board in 1947.

After two years in office, Carl Zeidler enlisted in the Navy at the height of World War II. Carl was killed at sea when his ship was lost and became a local hero, helping to pave the way for his younger brother to become mayor. In 1948 Frank Zeidler ran for mayor in a crowded field of fourteen candidates and won, undoubtedly aided by the familiarity of his surname. The large field of candidates was due to Mayor John Bohn declining to seek re-election in 1948. Among the candidates that year was attorney Henry S. Reuss, a Democrat who later went on to win election to Congress in 1954. Zeidler was re-elected in 1952 and 1956, but declined to seek another term in 1960, citing health reasons.

Zeidler was Milwaukee's third Socialist mayor (after Emil Seidel [1910-12] and Daniel Hoan [1916-40]), making Milwaukee the largest American city to elect three Socialists to its highest office.

Mayoralty 
During Frank Zeidler's administration, Milwaukee grew industrially and never had to borrow money to repay loans. During this period, Milwaukee nearly doubled its size with an aggressive campaign of municipal annexations: large parts of the Town of Lake and most of the Town of Granville were annexed to the city. The park system was upgraded. Zeidler spearheaded planning and construction of the beginning of Milwaukee's freeway system, and turned it over to Milwaukee County in 1954. A transportation advocate claims that Zeidler always maintained that the projected Milwaukee freeway system should have been built and that the city's competitiveness had been compromised by the failure to complete the planned system.

Zeidler's plans for the city were only a partial success. Milwaukee doubled in area through annexation and it experienced very little decline in population during a period of American urban decline starting in the 1960s and lasting until about 1990. Suburban residents and governments fiercely resisted annexation and the politics of regional Milwaukee became highly factional. An attorney who sued to block annexation claimed Zeidler planted listening devices in his office. Zeidler, angry about the resistance to his plans, said in 1958: "The city consults with suburban governments, but we do not believe they have reason for existing."

Zeidler faced the vexing issue of race relations as Milwaukee's African-American population tripled during the 1950s. Zeidler was a vocal supporter of the civil rights movement and his opponents tried to exploit this to their advantage. Zeidler's political enemies spread false rumors that Zeidler had put billboards in the South asking blacks to come north. Many workers in Milwaukee were threatened for supporting Zeidler. One manufacturer even threatened to fire employees who voted for Zeidler. Zeidler cited bad personal health and the race issue as reasons for not running for re-election in 1960.

A 1993 survey of historians, political scientists and urban experts conducted by Melvin G. Holli of the University of Illinois at Chicago ranked Zeidler as the twenty-first-best American big-city mayor to have served between the years 1820 and 1993.

After leaving office 
After leaving office, Frank Zeidler worked as a mediator, as development director for Alverno College, and served in the administration of Wisconsin Governor John W. Reynolds. As a leader of the Public Enterprise Committee, Zeidler was a frequent and severe critic of his successor, Henry Maier. He supported a number of unsuccessful attempts to defeat Maier in subsequent elections.

Zeidler was instrumental in re-forming the Socialist Party USA in 1973, and served as its National Chair for many years. He was the party's presidential nominee in 1976, getting on ten state ballots. The party had 400-600 members nationwide at the time. Zeidler agreed to run when other leading members of the SPUSA declined to do so. He and his running mate, J. Quinn Brisben, received 6,038 votes, including approximately 2,500 in Milwaukee County, Wisconsin.

On July 26, 2004 Zeidler appeared at the 2004 Green Party National Convention in Milwaukee to welcome delegates to the convention.

He died July 7, 2006, and is buried at Forest Home Cemetery in Milwaukee. His mayoral and personal papers are archived at Milwaukee Public Library along with those of his brother Carl Zeidler. Several additional boxes of his papers are archived at the Golda Meir Library of the University of Wisconsin–Milwaukee.

Writing and scholarship
Zeidler wrote several books, including not only treatises on municipal government, labor law, socialism, and Milwaukee history, but poetry, renditions of four of Shakespeare's plays into present-day English, and children's stories. His 1961 memoir of his time as mayor, A Liberal in City Government, was published in 2005 by Milwaukee Publishers LLC, a local company formed for the purpose.

On June 13, 1958 Zeidler was the first person to receive an honorary doctorate from the University of Wisconsin–Milwaukee., which now sponsors the Frank P. Zeidler International
Graduate Student Travel Award, a scholarship enabling a non-American scholar to study for a master's degree in American history at UWM. The Wisconsin Labor History Society also sponsors an annual undergraduate Frank P. Zeidler Scholarship in labor history. The Milwaukee Public Library's historic collections are housed in the Frank P. Zeidler Humanities Room, named in his honor. On May 21, 2006 he received an honorary Doctor of Humane Letters degree from Cardinal Stritch University in Milwaukee.

Jeanne Zeidler 
Zeidler's daughter, Jeanne Zeidler, served as mayor of Williamsburg, Virginia, from 1998 until 2010, when she retired.

See also 
 List of elected socialist mayors in the United States

References

Further reading
 Hayes, Paul G. "Remembering Zeidler". Wisconsin People & Ideas, vol. 52, no. 4 (Fall 2006), pp. 30–32.

External links 
Oral History Interview with Frank Zeidler, July 17, 1981
"The Last Socialist Mayor". Interviewer, Amy Goodman. Democracy Now!. June 21, 2004.
 "Before Bernie Sanders, There Was Zeidler, a Religious Socialist", The New York Times
Funeral service video clips includes tributes by Mayor Tom Barrett and historian John Gurda

1912 births
2006 deaths
American Christian pacifists
American Christian socialists
American Lutherans
American people of German descent
American political party founders
University of Chicago alumni
Marquette University alumni
Mayors of Milwaukee
Politicians from Milwaukee
Socialist Party of America politicians from Wisconsin
Socialist Party USA presidential nominees
Candidates in the 1976 United States presidential election
University of Wisconsin–Milwaukee alumni
Writers from Wisconsin
School board members in Wisconsin
Socialist Party USA politicians from Wisconsin
Lutheran socialists
20th-century American politicians
20th-century Lutherans